14 Compositions (Traditional) 1996 is a live album by composer and saxophonist Anthony Braxton with multi-instrumentalist Stewart Gillmor, recorded at Wesleyan University in 1994 and released on the Leo label.

Reception

The Allmusic review by  Steve Loewy stated:

Track listing
 "Rosetta" (Earl Hines, Henri Woode) – 4:20
 "Kansas City Man Blues" (Clarence Johnson, Clarence Williams) – 5:18
 "Do You Know What It Means to Miss New Orleans?" (Louis Alter, Eddie DeLange) – 3:30
 "Blue, Turning Grey Over You" (Fats Waller, Andy Razaf) – 3:50
 "Skylark" (Hoagy Carmichael, Johnny Mercer) – 6:15
 "Battle Cry" (Clifford L. Waite) – 0:59
 "Ain't Gonna Give Nobody None of This Jelly Roll" (Spencer Williams) – 4:12
 "In a Sentimental Mood" (Duke Ellington) – 4:11
 "I'm Gonna Sit Right Down and Write Myself a Letter" (Fred E. Ahlert, Joe Young) – 4:29
 "Stardust" (Carmichael) – 6:18
 "The Memphis Blues" (W. C. Handy) – 5:24
 "Some Day You'll Be Sorry" (Louis Armstrong) – 6:19
 "Blues My Naughty Sweetie Give to Me" (Arthur Swanstone, Carey Morgan, Charles McCarron) – 6:57
 "Ja-Da" (Bob Carleton) – 1:56

Personnel
 Anthony Braxton – soprano saxophone, alto saxophone, tenor saxophone, bass saxophone, flute, clarinet, contrabass clarinet
Stewart Gillmor – piano, cornet, valve trombone, flugelhorn, double bell euphonium, sousaphone

References

Anthony Braxton live albums
1998 live albums
Leo Records albums